The Audi e-tron Vision Gran Turismo is a two-seater concept car developed by Audi Sport GmbH and was manufactured in Germany. In April 2018, the car was unveiled at the Audi Competence Center Motorsport at Neuburg an der Donau, Bavaria, Germany, four days after two teaser trailers were released on YouTube. The car was fully constructed in a span of 11 months.

The car was deemed the first official fully functioning concept car that can drive on the roads. This is also the first fully functioning concept car which matches the virtual and "on-paper" specifications with the real specifications.

Vehicle data 
The Audi e-tron Vision Gran Turismo has three electric motors, two at the rear axle, one at the front axle. The car runs on a permanent all-wheel drive drivetrain. The car does contain some elements used for future "e-tron" production cars, according to Audi. The e-tron Vision Gran Turismo also uses Audi's DTM ceramic brakes and steering wheel, 305-width racing tyres, and other parts from the Audi R8 LMS, their Group GT3 race car.

According to Audi and Polyphony Digital, the car also performs a  run of 2.5 seconds.

Marc Lichte led the entire design process, with Andreas Krüger completing the exterior. The vehicle's design and livery is heavily inspired by the Audi 90 quattro IMSA GTO.

Media 
The Audi e-tron Vision Gran Turismo is available for virtual driving in the Polyphony Digital racing game, Gran Turismo Sport. Two versions exist in the game, with one of them (which does not exist in the real world) scrapping the "e-tron" moniker and opting for a 3.4-liter turbocharged V6 engine with hybrid assistance from a single electric motor.

The Audi e-tron Vision Gran Turismo featured in the game has a significantly more conceptualized and fictitious interior compared to its real world counterpart's more conventional race car design.

Motorsport 
The e-tron Vision Gran Turismo is used as a race taxi for the ABB FIA Formula E Championship in the 2017–18 season. In the e-tron, customers of Audi are able to experience Formula E's city circuits as passengers with either racing drivers Rahel Frey or Rinaldo "Dindo" Capello driving the concept car. Its first was in Rome, Italy at the Circuto Cittadino dell'EUR, the street circuit for the Rome ePrix.

See also 
 Audi e-tron (brand)
 Vision Gran Turismo
 Gran Turismo Sport

References 

e-tron Vision Gran Turismo
Gran Turismo (series)